Leonard Jordan Lehrman is an American composer who was born in Kansas, on August 20, 1949, and grew up in Roslyn, New York.  Since August 3, 1999, he has resided in Valley Stream, New York.

His teachers included Lenore Anhalt, Elie Siegmeister, Olga Heifetz, the Guarneri Quartet, Elizabeth Korte, Earl Kim, Kyriena Siloti, Harry Levin, Nadia Boulanger, Jean-Jacques Painchaud, Leon Kirchner, David Del Tredici, James Yannatos, Karel Husa, William Austin, Robert Palmer, George Gibian, Tibor Kozma, Wolfgang Vacano, Donald Erb, and John Eaton. On July 31, 1978 he married Karen Shaw Campbell.  They were divorced in November, 1986.  On July 14, 2002 he married Helene Williams Spierman.  They have collaborated on over 675 performances since March 1987, including 17 CDs and over 4000 videos on YouTube, with over 1,000,000 views to date.

He graduated cum laude from Harvard; received a master's degree and a doctorate in music composition from Cornell; a master's degree in library science from Long Island University and studied under a Fulbright scholarship in Paris with Nadia Boulanger.  His first original opera was the subject of a 2014 doctoral thesis by Jeremy Blackwood, posted at https://digital.library.unt.edu/ark:/67531/metadc700028/m2/1/high_res_d/dissertation.pdf

Life and career
Lehrman has composed 258 works to date, including 12 operas and 7 musicals. He composed also more than 400 vocal works. He won the 2002 Sunrise/Sunset Competition of the Brookhaven Arts Council in 2002 for his setting of Abel Meeropol (Lewis Allan)'s poem "Conscience". Since 1973 he has worked as conductor, coach, pianist, composer, and/or translator for the Metropolitan Opera (assistant chorus master 1977–78), Bel Canto Opera, After Dinner Opera Company, Aviva Players, the Metropolitan Philharmonic Chorus, the Jewish Music Theater of Berlin, the Jewish People's Philharmonic Chorus, the Workmen's Circle Chorus, the Oceanside Chorale, the Blaue Jungs/Hanseaten Deern German Chorus of East Meadow, and the Bronx Opera.  He edited The Marc Blitzstein Songbook (3v., Boosey & Hawkes 1999–2003), authored Marc Blitzstein: A Bio-Bibliography (Greenwood/Praeger, 2005), and co-authored Elie Siegmeister, American Composer: A Bio-Bibliography (Scarecrow, 2010). He has also written for The Hilltop Beacon (critic-at-large, 1966–67), Harvard Crimson (critic, 1967–68), WHRB (chief producer, 1968–70), Dunster Drama Review (1970–71), Risley Review (1973–75), WBAI (Producer, "Music of All the Americas," 1989–91), Opera Monthly (associate editor, 1990–94), Opera Journal  (critic, 1995–97), Aufbau (critic, 1995–2002), andante.com (2002), Jewish Currents (1981–present), New Music Connoisseur (2001–2016, part of that time as copy editor), Soundwordsight.com (2015–present), and other publications.

His operas include Tales of Malamud (Idiots First (1973) – completion of work begun by Marc Blitzstein; Karla (1974); and Suppose A Wedding (1996), based on two stories and a play by Bernard Malamud); Sima (1976), based on The Krasovitsky Couple by David A. Aizman, tr. Edgar H. Lehrman; Hannah (1980) based on Midrashic legends, libretto in collaboration with Orel Protopopescu; The Family Man (1984), based on story by Mikhail Sholokhov; The Birthday of the Bank (1988), in Russian (and English tr. by composer) on Anton Chekhov's Yubilei; New World: An Opera About What Columbus Did to the "Indians" (1991), libretto in collaboration with Joel Shatzky; Sacco and Vanzetti –completion of work begun by Marc Blitzstein; The Wooing (2003), libretto by Abel Meeropol  based on Anton Chekhov's The Boor; The Triangle Fire (2016), libretto by Ellen Frankel, and A Loveletter from Rosa Luxemburg (2019).

His musicals include The Comic Tragedy of San Po Jo (1963), book & lyrics in collaboration with Mark Kingdon; Growing Up Woman (1979), book & lyrics by Barbara Tumarkin Dunham; Kommt, wir aendern die Welt! (1981), book & lyrics by Guenter-Heinz Loscher, translated into Brooklynese by composer as Let's Change the Woild!; E.G.: A Musical Portrait of Emma Goldman (1987), book & lyrics in collaboration with Karen Ruoff Kramer; Superspy!: The S-e-c-r-e-t Musical (1988–91, rev. 2014), book by Joel Shatzky, lyrics in collaboration; The Booby Trap or  Off Our Chests (2001–2008), book by Sydney Ross Singer, lyrics in collaboration; Adam & Lilith & Eve (1993–2015), book by Manya Pruzhanskaya Lackow.

His translations include Bertolt Brecht's Days of the Commune (1971) and Round Heads and Pointed Heads (1973), 20 Johannes Brahms songs, 13 Gerhard Bronner cabaret songs, Harry Oschitzki (Andy Orieli) and Heinrich Heine cycles, and other poems and essays from the German; Emmanuel Chabrier's L'Etoile (1988) and An Incomplete Education (2006) and songs by Claude Debussy (10), Jacques Brel, and Georges Brassens from the French; songs by Ya'acov Rotblit and Naomi Shemer from the Hebrew; "In der Fremd" from the Yiddish by Leyb Naydus; an ode by Euripides from the ancient Greek; Modest Mussorgsky's Zhenitba (Getting Married) (1973), Mikhail Glinka's A Life for the Tsar  (1979), and Rusalka (Dargomyzhsky) (1986) from the Russian – in collaboration with his mother, Emily R. Lehrman (1923–2015), along with poems by Yevgeny Yevtushenko and Andrei Voznesensky (1967); Vladimir Mayakovsky (1970); Anna Akhmatova, Alexander Blok, Afanasy Fet, Ivan Krylov, Gavrila Derzhavin (all 1977); Velemir Khlebnikov and Alexander Pushkin (1986); Yefim Medvedovsky (2013–2016); and Galina Leybovich (2015).  In 2016 he translated Sergei Slonimsky's opera King Lear, based on the Boris Pasternak Russian translation of Shakespeare, back into English.

From 1992 to 2003 he was Music Director at Malverne Community Presbyterian Church and from 1995 to 2001 at North Shore Synagogue in Syosset. Having worked at many other churches and synagogues, in February 2014 he became organist, choir director and composer-in-residence of Christ Church Lutheran in Rosedale, New York. In August 2014 he became High Holidays organist and choir director of the Metropolitan Synagogue in Manhattan. In October 2021 he became organist, choir director and composer-in-residence of Grace Episcopal Church in Massapequa, New York.  His works and performances are represented on recordings by Opus One, Premier, Capstone Records, Albany Records,  Original Cast (record label), Ravello (Parma Records), and Toccata Classics.

Discography
 "Marc Blitzstein Music for Solo Piano" Toccata Classics 0438 (2019)
 "Harmonize Your Spirit With My Calm: Instrumental Works and Songs to Poetry of Russian and American Poets" by Leonard Lehrman & Joel Mandelbaum, with Helene Williams, Alexander Mikhalëv, the Meridian String Quartet, and the State Symphony Orchestra of St. Petersburg, Vladimir Lande, cond., Ravello Records 7951 (2016)
 Leonard Lehrman, Helene Williams, Lars Woodul, and the Metropolitan Philharmonic Chorus, "The Elie Siegmeister Centennial CD," Original Cast (record label)  (2008)
 Helene Williams & Leonard Lehrman, "Diamond Jubilee: Songs By David Diamond," Albany Records (2006)
 Leonard Lehrman, "The Marc Blitzstein Centennial Concert CD," performed by Metropolitan Philharmonic Chorus & Soloists, Original Cast (record label)  (2005)
 Lehman Engel, Herbert Haufrecht, Martin Kalmanoff, Robert Kurka, Leonard Lehrman, Joel Mandelbaum, Abel Meeropol, Earl Robinson, Elie Siegmeister, Kurt Weill, "The Abel Meeropol Centennial Concert," performed by Metropolitan Philharmonic Chorus & Soloists, Original Cast (record label)  (2003)
 Leonard Lehrman, Gregory Mercer,  James Sergi, and Helene Williams,  "A Marc Blitzstein Songbook," Original Cast (record label) (2001)
 Eleanor Cory, Herbert Deutsch, Lukas Foss, Morton Gould, Andre Hosza, Leo Kraft, Leonard Lehrman, Joel Mandelbaum, Angelo Musolino, Raoul Pleskow, Elie Siegmeister, Hale Smith, Serge Suny, performed by Leonard Lehrman, "Long Island Composers Alliance," Capstone Records(1999)
 Ralph Alan Dale, Daniel Dorff, Denise Broadhurst, Janis Sabatino Hills, Leonard Lehrman, Joel Mandelbaum, Angelo Musolino, Elie Siegmeister, Hale Smith, Mira J. Spektor, and Raymond VunKannon, "Helene Williams Sings More Songs Of Love," "Long Island Composers Alliance," Capstone Records (1999)
 Adele Berk,  Leonard Lehrman, Elie Siegmeister, Jeanne Singer, and Albert Tepper, "Helene Williams Sings Songs Of Love", "Long Island Composers Alliance,"Capstone Records (1997)
 Anne Watson Born, Becky Dale, Herbert Feldman, Frederick Frahm, Leo Kraft, Leonard Lehrman, Matthew Marullo, Akmal Parwez, Joseph Pehrson, Abram M. Plum, Harriette Slack Richardson, George Selbst, Judi Silvano,  "The William Cullen Bryant Bicentennial Concert," "Long Island Composers Alliance," Capstone Records(1995)
 Ronald Edwards, Leonard Lehrman, Helene Williams, "A [Marc] Blitzstein Cabaret," Premier Recordings (1990)
 Leonard Lehrman, Peter Schlosser, and Helene Williams, The Metropolitan Philharmonic Chorus & Orchestra, "We Are Innocent: Rosenberg Cantata," Opus One (1989)

References

External links
 Leonard J. Lehrman site* Chazzanut online – Leonard Lehrman – Helene Williams
 superpages.com – Court St Music Instruction
 New York Green Fest 2011 – Helene Williams, soprano & Leonard Lehrman, composer/pianist: Songs of Protest, Naturism & Broadway
 Allmusic – Helene Williams
 The New York Times, July 14, 2002 – WEDDINGS; Helene Williams-Spierman, Leonard Lehrman
 Lehrman

1949 births
American male classical composers
Living people
Classical musicians from Kansas
American opera composers
Male opera composers
People from Valley Stream, New York
Harvard University alumni
Cornell University alumni
Long Island University alumni
People from Roslyn, New York
20th-century American composers
20th-century classical composers
20th-century American male musicians
21st-century American composers
21st-century classical composers
21st-century American male musicians